Fabomotizole (INN; brand name Afobazole) is an anxiolytic drug launched in Russia in the early 2000s. It produces anxiolytic and neuroprotective effects without any sedative or muscle relaxant actions. Its mechanism of action remains poorly defined however, with GABAergic, NGF- and BDNF-release-promoting, MT1 receptor agonism, MT3 receptor antagonism, and sigma agonism suggested as potential mechanisms. Fabomotizole was shown to inhibit MAO-A reversibly and there might be also some involvement with serotonin receptors. Clinical trials have shown fabomotizole to be well tolerated and reasonably effective for the treatment of anxiety.

Experiments of mice have shown antimutagenic and antiteratogenic properties.

Fabomotizole has found little clinical use outside Russia and has not been evaluated by the FDA.

See also
 Mebicar
 Phenibut
 Selank
 Validol
 Bemethyl

References 

Anxiolytics
Drugs with unknown mechanisms of action
4-Morpholinyl compunds
Thioethers
Benzimidazoles
Phenol ethers
Russian drugs
Melatonin receptor antagonists
Monoamine oxidase inhibitors
Sigma agonists